Fairbanks is an unincorporated community in Fairbanks Township, Sullivan County, in the U.S. state of Indiana.

The community is part of the Terre Haute Metropolitan Statistical Area.

History
Fairbanks was named after Sgt. Nathan Fairbanks, who was killed in September 1812 when his platoon of 12 soldiers was ambushed by a group of Indians just outside the town. The post office at Fairbanks has been in operation since 1878.

Geography
It is shown on the Fairbanks United States Geological Survey 7½° quadrangle.

References

Unincorporated communities in Sullivan County, Indiana
Unincorporated communities in Indiana
Terre Haute metropolitan area